Muslim ban may refer to:

 Trump travel ban, various travel bans by President Donald Trump against people from certain Muslim-majority countries
 Muslim immigration ban